Kalki is a 2019 Indian Telugu-language action thriller film directed by Prasanth Varma. The film stars Rajasekhar, Rahul Ramakrishna, Adah Sharma, Nandita Swetha and Pujita Ponnada in the lead roles.

Plot
In 1983, Kollapur, a village situated near Nallamala forest, a journalist Deva Dutta from Hyderabad converses with a senior citizen to learn about the history of Kollapur. In 1947, Nizam, opposing the incorporation of Hyderabad state into India after independence of the country from British Raj, sent Razakars to ruin Hindu provinces and temples. In such scuffle, the generous aristocrat of Kollapur, Raja Balakishan Rao had died due to the betrayal of his greedy commander Narsappa. After the state successfully became a part of India in 1948, Narsappa desired to contest in the general elections but Raja Balakishan Rao's confidant Raja Ratnam advised Raja Balakishan Rao's wife Rani Ramachandramma to participate in the elections for social welfare. She subsequently wins and establishes several institutions like school and hospital for Kollapur . Taking advantage of Raja Ratnam's strained relationship with his son Perumallu, Narsappa looted the treasury and set fire to the palace that apparently killed Rani Ramachandramma, Raja Ratnam and the former's child. As a result, Narsappa established his control over Kollapur.

Presently, fire breaks out at a desi liquor store, that was evidently created to kill Narsappa's tender-hearted brother Sekhar Babu, whose burning corpse is found hanging to the tree. Believing that Perumallu had murdered his brother due to their recent fall out, Narsappa wreaks havoc trying to find Perumallu, who goes into hiding. Police Department assigns Kalki IPS in charge of Sekhar Babu's murder case while Dutta seeks to help him. Together, they find out that a murder attempt on Sekhar Babu was staged a few days ago during Bonalu with a poisoned arrow but Sekhar Babu's friend was shot inadvertently. Upon perceiving from the Ayurvedic doctor who treated Sekhar Babu's friend, that the poison was extracted from a breed of snake found in Nagulakona, a hamlet that was destroyed to due to recent forest fire killing everyone in it, Dutta and Kalki leave to Nagulakona. Touring the burnt area of Nagulakona, Kalki realizes that the fire was not natural, but engineered to kill the villagers. Narsappa abducts a tribal girl Paala Pitta to make her, his concubine but she makes excuses to protect herself temporarily but continues to stay at his residence.

Dutta learns that Kalki was in love with Padma, Head doctor in the local govt hospital but their relationship was strained as Kalki inadvertently killed Padma's father, a school headmaster, who was housing maoists. Parallelly, Kalki and Dutta learn that a love story was brewing between Sekhar Babu and a Muslim graduate Asima Khan, daughter of Adv. Kabir Khan. They meet the latter and learn that Asima wanted to establish a boating business that helped people travel to Srisailam from Kollapur through the river in forest. When Sekhar Babu helped her through this and succeeded in establishing the business, the boats carrying 60 people were ambushed and everyone were brutally murdered. As Asima was blamed of the incident due to her religion, Kabir migrated to another village with Asima and he believes that Sekhar Babu was also murdered for trying to crack the conspiracy. Kabir Khan states that there is an eyewitness for the massacre, who is not ready to come to court. Kalki and Dutta meet the eyewitness Sambashivam, a saint dedicated to the service of Hanuman and learn from him that few masked men had ambushed the boats and killed the people by drowning them to death. However, Sambashivam doesn't wish to testify against the masked men in the court or Police station.

There is a myth over the village that Rani Ramachandramma's spirit haunts the burnt palace but Kalki discovers that the owner of desi liquor store, where Sekhar Babu died had been masquerading as the ghost to evade a murder attempt on him from Narsappa. From the owner of the store, Kalki perceives that few hours before he died, Sekhar Babu gifted a watch to the owner for vacating the store so that he could enjoy alone with his friends. From a portrait in the palace, Kalki and Dutta realize that Sambashivam is none other than Raja Ratnam, who apparently died in the fire but actually escaped it. They go to meet Sambashivam alias Raja Ratnam and perceive that he is hiding Perumallu from Narsappa. Sambashivam expresses his regret over not being able to save Ramachandramma and her son and for not bringing up his son in a proper way. However, Kalki convinces them to come with him. At the same time, they are ambushed by the same masked men who wound Sambashivam while Kalki manages to rescue Perumallu. Before dying, Sambashivam tells Kalki that the recurrences are not coincidental but are due to Karma, perplexing Dutta. Kalki apprehends one of the masked men, who is severely wounded and admits him in hospital in care of Padma. When Kalki tries to grab the man's testimony about Narsappa's role behind the so-called forest fires in Nagulakona and the massacre of boats, the man uses Padma as a human shield but is shot to death by Kalki and that's when Padma realizes that Kalki was not wrong.

When the tribal man, who attempted to murder Sekhar Babu with the poisoned arrow, tries to kill Perumallu, Dutta and Kalki apprehend him and learn from the person that he is a native of Nagulakona, in which people were brutally murdered and burnt to death by Narsappa, Perumallu and other masked men. That's what led the tribal man to seek vengeance against Narsappa and his family, so he attempted to murder Sekhar Babu. Perumally escapes from the custody.

Kalki meets his superior and divulges that Nagulakona was an obstacle for Narsappa to operate his red sandalwood smuggling business due to which he got rid of the villagers and staged a forest fire. The boats were going through the same river route and therefore, Narsappa felt the boating business to be a hindrance for his men to chop the sandalwood and massacred the boats, framing it on Asima. Kalki arrests Narsappa revealing the fact that Paala Pitta is an undercover cop. On the way, Perumally shoots Narsappa and Kalki encounters the former, closing the case but is slightly injured. Dutta receives his promotion for covering the incident.

In hospital, Asima meets Kalki but Padma misinterprets their conversation and presumes that they are having an affair. However, Asima makes it clear to Padma that Kalki was like Lord Krishna to her when she was trapped in a situation like Draupadi. She reveals that it was Kalki who murdered Sekhar Babu. Sekhar Babu was a helping hand to his brother in crimes and was not like the villagers thought of him. When Asima came to know about Sekhar Babu's hand behind the boats massacre when she met him at the liquor store, she tried to escape but was caught by Sekhar Babu and his friends, who attempted to molest her but Kalki, who was roaming around in dejection as Padma broke up with him on the same day arrived to protect her and tied Sekhar Babu and his friends to the tree but Sekhar Babu's lighter slipped from his pocket and the tree, wet with kerosene is burnt  killing everyone tied to the tree. Padma, realizing Kalki's true nature reconciles with him. Dutta overhears Asima and Padma's conversation and tries to inform it to Kalki's superior but realizes that Police department sent Kalki to eliminate Narsappa and Perumallu for their crimes. Dutta tries to inform it to his boss, the editor but is interrupted by a woman searching for Kalki's room. After she leaves, Dutta realizes that the woman is Ramachandramma, who was presumed to be dead along with her son. Dutta follows her to Kalki's room and realizes that Kalki is her son. Dutta realizes that Karma led Kalki to Kollapur and he avenged the injustice done to his village, as a royal descendant unbeknownst to himself. That's what is meant by Sambashivam, who died protecting Kalki after seeing the chain belonging to royal family with him.

Kalki is discharged from the hospital and leaves with Padma, Ramachandramma and his assistant.

Cast

Production 
After the success ofAwe (2018), Rajasekhar expressed interest to act under the direction of Prasanth Varma. Prasanth decided to do a commercial film as his second venture because he did not want to be typecasted. The original story with twists was written by Saitej Desharaj in a web-series format, following which, Prasanth had to adapt the original story into a screenplay for the format of a feature film. This process took eight months to finish.

Soundtrack

Release
Kalki opened to mixed reviews from the critics. The Times of India gave the film three out of five stars and stated that the film is "worth a watch" and although "the film isn’t as suspenseful as they come, it still keeps things entertaining till the end". Sangeetha Devi Dundoo of The Hindu wrote "There’s an element of surprise towards the end, but the journey towards it is tedious". Hemanth Kumar of Firstpost wrote "Although Kalki finds its mojo in bits and pieces, it tries hard to whip up emotion where there’s none, and ends up as a big bore". 123Telugu wrote "On the whole, Kalki is an investigative thriller ".

References

External links
 

2019 films
2010s Telugu-language films
Indian action thriller films
2019 action thriller films
Films directed by Prasanth Varma